The piers in San Francisco are part of the Port of San Francisco and run along the Embarcadero, following the curve along the eastern waterfront and roadway of the Port of San Francisco. The Ferry Building is considered the center with the odd-numbered piers going north of the building at Market Street, and the even-numbered piers going south.

Piers

Odd 

 Ferry Building and Pier 1
 Pier 1 1⁄2 - Water taxi service
 Pier 3 - Offices of Hornblower Cruises
 Pier 5 - Central Embarcadero Piers Historic District
 Pier 7 - Pier 7 Photos on the Commons
 Pier 9 - Pier 9 Photos on the Commons
 Pier 11 - Pier 11 Photos on the Commons
 Pier 13 - Pier 13 Photos on the Commons 
 Piers 15 and 17 - Exploratorium
 Pier 19 - Pier 19 Photos on the Commons
 Pier 23 - Pier 23 Photos on the Commons
 Piers 27 and 29 - America's Cup Park
 Pier 31 - Pier 31 Photos on the Commons
 Pier 33 - Alcatraz Ferry
 Pier 35 - Princess Cruises
 Pier 39 - Home to sea lions
 Pier 41 - A ferry terminal on Fisherman's Wharf, home to the Blue & Gold Fleet
 Pier 43 - Pier 43 Photos on the Commons
 Pier 43 1/2 - Home to the Red & White Fleet
 Pier 45 - Home to museum ships

Past the numbered piers, there are other well-known piers past Pier 45 at the western end of Fisherman's Wharf.
 Hyde Street Pier
 Municipal Pier

Even 

 Pier 14 - Pier 14 Photos on the Commons
 Pier 16 - Pier 16 Photos on the Commons
 Pier 18 - Pier 18 Photos on the Commons
 Pier 20 - Pier 20 Photos on the Commons
 Pier 22 1/2 - Pier 22 1/2 Photos on the Commons
 Pier 24 - Home to Pier 24 Photography
 Pier 26 - Shelton Studios
 Pier 28 - Pier 28 Photos on the Commons
 Piers 30 and 32 - Piers 30 and 32 Photos on the Commons
 Pier 34 - Pier 34 Photos on the Commons
 Pier 36 - Pier 36 Photos on the Commons
 Pier 38 - Pier 38 Photos on the Commons
 Pier 40 - Pier 40 Photos on the Commons
 Pier 42 - Pier 42 Photos on the Commons
 Pier 48 - Next to McCovey Cove
 Pier 50 - home of the Ready Reserve Force ( RORO ships)
 Pier 52 - Pier 52 Photos on the Commons
 Pier 70 - home to the Union Iron Works
 Pier 80 - Pier 80 Photos on the Commons
 Pier 90 - Pier 90 Photos on the Commons
 Pier 92 - Pier 92 Photos on the Commons

See also
 Ferries of San Francisco Bay
 List of piers
 Transportation in the San Francisco Bay Area

References

 
San Francisco-related lists
Piers